Jean Achache (1952) is a French director, screenwriter, film producer, and writer.

Biography 
Jean Achache began his career as a filmmaker in the mid-1970s alongside Robert Enrico as an assistant director for Le Vieux Fusil and The Secret. In the eighties, he collaborated with Bertrand Tavernier on films like Death Watch or A Sunday in the Country. Jean Achache then turned to the realization of his own works through clips, documentaries like Diabolo's Workshop with Terry Gilliam and films like the adaptation of the novel Un soir au Club by Christian Gailly in 2009.

In 2006, he published his first novel Juste une nuit at Éditions du Masque.

Filmography

Director

Cinema 
 1994: Les deux Amants (short film)
 1994:  (short film)
 2004: Marcel !
 2006: La guerre du Nil aura-t-elle lieu ? (documentary)
 2009: Diabolo'S Workshop (documentary)
 2009: Un soir au club

Clips 
 1989: Le petit Train, Les Rita Mitsouko
 1990: Regarde les riches, Patricia Kaas
 1990: Au Tourniquet des grands cafés, Jean Guidoni
 1990: Des fleurs pour Salinger, Indochine
 1991: Punishment Park, Indochine
 1997: Love in Motion, Peter Kingsbery

Producer 
 1987: Waiting for the moon

Screenwriter 
 2009: Un soir au club

References

External links 
 Jean Acache on L'ARP
 

French film directors
French male screenwriters
21st-century French screenwriters
French producers
21st-century French novelists
1950s births
Living people
French male novelists
21st-century French male writers